Sara Errani and Roberta Vinci were the defending champions, but lost to Serena and Venus Williams in the quarterfinals.
Andrea Hlaváčková and Lucie Hradecká won the title, defeating Ashleigh Barty and Casey Dellacqua in the final,  6–7(4–7), 6–1, 6–4.

Seeds

Draw

Finals

Top half

Section 1

Section 2

Bottom half

Section 3

Section 4

References

External links
2013 US Open – Women's draws and results at the International Tennis Federation

Women's Doubles
US Open – Women's Doubles
US Open (tennis) by year – Women's doubles
2013 in women's tennis
2013 in American women's sports